Since the 2001 fall of their national government in Afghanistan, Taliban propaganda has developed into a sophisticated public relations machine that is shaping perceptions in Afghanistan and abroad. Although polls show the movement remains unpopular, the insurgents have readily exploited a sense of growing alienation fostered by years of broken government promises, official corruption, and the rising death toll among civilians from airstrikes and other military actions. "The result is weakening public support for nation-building, even though few actively support the Taliban," says a report from the International Crisis Group, a think tank that monitors conflicts. An American official in Afghanistan agrees: "We cannot afford to be passive [communicators] any longer if we're going to turn this around."

Thomas Howard Johnson, who served as the American Special Envoy to Afghanistan (1989–92), says that "nearly the entire propaganda production platform for the Taliban’s information campaign carried out inside Afghanistan is
located in Pakistan and overseen by ISI", including the magazines Al Somood, In Fight, Shahamat, Elhan, Murchal, the monthly pamphlet Srak and media studios and video production facilities of Alemarah, al Hijirat and Mana-ul Jihad. It was often alleged that there has been a great deal of help coming from the Pakistan’s ISI ( Inter – State Services ).

Background

A primary focus in the Taliban's media message is the history of wars between Christians and Muslims.  The Taliban emphasize religious and cultural differences between the West and the East, the idea of the clash of civilizations, denounce the West as oppressive against Islam, call the War on Terror a War against Islam, and condemn the international forces as "occupiers and invaders."  They portray the government of Afghanistan as its puppet, and the reconstruction works as "efforts of Christianizing Afghanistan," by using civilian casualties of air strikes and using media reports of prisoners' abuses and mistreatment in their favor.

Post-9/11

Early Taliban post-December 2001 media efforts were limited and cautious, reflecting the precarious nature of their position. The first media spokesman appointed after the  collapse of the regime was Abdul Latif Hakimi. When Pakistani authorities arrested Hakimi on 4 October 2005, he was replaced by as many as three successors. One of these new spokesmen, Muhammad Hanif, was himself arrested in January 2007. The main aim of Taliban media activities during this time was to publicize, in an often exaggerated fashion, Taliban operations undertaken in Afghanistan. This was achieved mainly through contact with Pakistani or international press, usually through radio, telephone or newspapers.

Strategy

The Taliban has become adept at portraying the West as being on the brink of defeat, at exploiting rifts between Washington and Kabul and at disparaging the administration of President Hamid Karzai as a "puppet" state with little reach outside the capital. The group is also attempting to assure Afghans that it has a strategy for governing the country again, presenting a platform of stamping out corruption and even protecting women's rights.

According to Afghan political analyst, Jelani Zwak, who has been studying Taliban propaganda for years, "they are not only talking about the occupation and civilian casualties. They are acting like an alternative to this government."

Village-level

As the propaganda front through formal spokesmen is vital to undermine the government and reach out to the world, the propaganda campaign at the village level is important for recruiting youths and acquiring local support. Mosques are favorite places for the Taliban propagandists who always seek to convince the villagers that the international forces are fighting against Islam and it is their holy obligation to stand up for jihad. Quoting from different religious sources and fatwas (Islamic decrees), they describe the international sources as occupiers and the Karzai government as their puppet and tell the local population that providing them support at any level is an un-Islamic act, hence punishable by the 'holy warriors.'

Effectiveness

The Taliban know how to take advantage of Western media outlets. For instance, on Aug. 18, the Taliban ambushed a French patrol about 30 miles from the Afghan capital, an attack that left 10 soldiers dead. Several weeks later, militants involved in the attack appeared in a glossy, eight-page magazine spread in Paris-Match, a leading French newsweekly, flaunting the weapons, uniforms and personal effects of the dead soldiers. Back in France, support for the war dropped to a new low. Defense Minister Herve Morin noted that the Taliban "understood that public opinion is probably the Achilles' heel" of the international community.

Structure

Along with four regional commands, the Afghan Taliban have 10 committees which address specific issues. Some of the members of the committees are also members of the Quetta Shura.  One of these committees - Culture and Information - deals with Taliban propaganda.  This committee is led by Amir Khan Muttaqi.

Maulvi Qudratullah Jamal served as the Taliban's chief of propaganda from 2002-2005.  He now runs an investigative committee that deals with complaints from Afghan citizens against local Taliban personnel. Jamal also operates as a liaison to the Taliban's global supporters.

Spokesmen

The formal spokesmen of the Taliban insurgents are the most active and effective measure of the group's propaganda front. They are appointed by Mullah Omar through a formal decree or statement, delivered to the media by a top aide.  This was not the case with Mufti Latifullah Hakimi, the first full-time Taliban spokesman, but all the later spokesmen were appointed this way. After his arrest on October 4, 2005, the number of spokesmen was increased to two: one for their activities in the southern and western provinces (Kandahar, Zabul, Oruzgan, Helmand, Herat, Nimroz, Farah, Badghis, Ghor and Sar-e-Pul) and the other for eastern, central and northern provinces (Badakhshan, Baghlan, Balkh, Bamiyan, Daykundi, Faryab, Ghazni, Jowzjan, Kabul, Kapisa, Khost, Kunar, Kunduz, Laghman, Logar, Nangrahar, Nuristan, Paktia, Paktika, Panjsher, Parwan, Samangan, Takhar, and Wardak). Currently, Qari Mohammad Yousuf Ahmadi acts as spokesman for the former provinces and Zabiullah Mujahid for the latter.

These spokesmen never provide regular and exact information about their fighters' casualties nor their attack tactics, operations, commanders' whereabouts and their own identities. But they are very fast in contacting local and international media for taking responsibility of attacks, claims of successes, formal statements, rejecting government officials' and international forces' claims, and other such issues.

Within the Taliban there are other groups who have their own spokesmen. For example, the Salafi (Wahhabi) Taliban in the eastern Kunar and Nuristan provinces, the Tora Bora Military Front in Nangrahar, and the Haqqani Network in the provinces bordering Waziristan (Khost, Paktia, Paktika) have their own spokesmen who contact the media on their own. Sometimes field commanders also contact the media for immediate effects of their attacks because they believe in the importance of a propaganda war. Gulbuddin Hekmatyar's Hizb-e-Islami, which associates himself and cooperates with the Taliban because of the "common enemy," has its own spokesman and it is observed, particularly in the case of major attacks, for example, the attack on French troops in Sarobi and the attack on a new year's celebrations in Kabul, that both Taliban's and Hekmatyar's spokesman claimed to have them carried out. Though he was member of the Taliban's leadership council, Mullah Dadullah, who was killed by the coalition forces in May 2007, had his own spokesman.

Media

The Taliban continues to rely heavily on decentralized, conventional propaganda efforts, which U.S. military officials say is the crucial battleground. These include the distribution of leaflets with threats or pleas, sermons in mosques and clandestine radio stations.  As the Islamist movement steps up conventional grass-roots propaganda efforts and polishes its online presence—going so as far as to provide Facebook and Twitter icons online that allow readers to disseminate press releases—the U.S.-led coalition finds itself on the defensive in the media war. Foreign troops are ill-equipped to offer counterarguments in mosques and other gatherings, forcing them to rely on Afghan officials to do so.

Internet
Internet has proved the fastest and the most useful propaganda tool for the Taliban during recent years.

Websites:  The Taliban have their own websites which are designed attractively and are full of all kinds of content such as news stories, statements, religious sermons, photos, videos, audio messages, guerrilla war guidelines and training manuals.

Since mid-2005, the militants have maintained a multilingual website that has repeatedly changed service providers to avoid being shut down. On April 9, The Washington Post reported that, for more than a year, a Houston-based firm had unwittingly hosted a site claiming to be the voice of the "Islamic Emirate of Afghanistan" (the name of Mullah Omar's regime, deposed by the 2001 U.S. invasion) before it was identified as such. It was updated with official messages and battlefield reports that were clearly and incredulous pieces of propaganda.

Videos:  Taliban spokesmen are known for exploiting captives through propaganda such as Private Bergdahl who was captured in June 2009.  Three videos of the missing private have been released, including one at Christmastime. In April 2010, a seven-minute video of the POW followed.  
Email:  Email is another way of effective communication for the Taliban insurgents. Through email, they communicate with reporters, news agencies, newspapers, magazines, and radio and TV channels for taking responsibility of attacks and providing official statements and other information.  Email interviews are also provided. Sometimes, clarifications and statements about some issues are sent to Pashto websites through email.
Twitter: Some Taliban members such as Malang Khostay and Qasr Bakhaly have used memes as a method of spreading pro-Taliban information on Twitter. They have gained a significant audience among the alt-right; many comparing Taliban insurgents to Confederate soldiers or protesters who took part in the 2021 Capitol Hill riot.

DVDs

On the streets of the Afghan capital Kabul and the Pakistani frontier city of Peshawar, cheap, mass-produced DVDs feature footage of coalition atrocities: mud-brick Afghan villages levelled by allied attacks and ordinary citizens allegedly killed by coalition fire. Also popular is a montage from the anti-Soviet jihad of the 1980s, part of a running effort to portray the current foreign troops as "invaders." Other discs show Taliban executions of so-called traitors and spectacular attacks against coalition forces.

Night letters

The Taliban method for night letters usually entails a warning delivered under a gate or nailed to a door in the dead of night. During the run-up to the 2010 Afghan parliamentary elections, the Taliban intimidated villagers in certain areas from voting. People in the villages would not vote because the Taliban left letters at night warning they will cut off the finger of anyone if they find it marked with the election ink used to prevent multiple voting.

Magazines

The Taliban have several Pashto, Urdu and Arabic magazines openly published and distributed in Peshawar and the adjacent areas. These colorful magazines are often printed on expensive foreign paper and distributed free. They are published by different groups within the Taliban and are full of extremist propaganda, distorted facts, photos of victims, lengthy interviews with insurgent commanders, and articles on different political and religious topics. These magazines publish only news stories and newspaper articles that back their own claims.

The quote above comes from an article published in the latest issue of Shahamat (The Bravery), a Taliban propaganda magazine in Pashto. The article is an example of how the Taliban's propaganda tactics exploit a particular incident or issue by elevating it with seemingly related background information to provoke the local people to stand up against occupation.

The different magazines, which vary in frequency of publication, length, languages (Pashto but also Dari, Urdu and Arabic) and so on, are Al Somood (Resistance), Srak (Beam of Light), Tora Bora Magazine, Shahamat (Courage/Bravery), In Fight, Elham (Inspiration/Revelation), Murchal (Trench), Mesaq-i-Esaar (Covenant of Sacrifice), Ihsas (Feelings), Resalat (Duty), Zamir (Conscience), Hittin, Wahdat, Nawa-I Afghan Jihad (Voice or melody of the Afghan Jihad), Likwal’ Hewad, and Khabroona.

Counter-propaganda

To counter the Taliban advances in the propaganda war, the Pentagon has reportedly launched a broad "psychological operations" campaign in Afghanistan to take down insurgent-run web sites and to jam radio stations. The Afghan Islamic Republic government, for its part, has opened a new $1.2 million media center with international support. Staffed by a team of Western-trained spin doctors, the facility includes a high-tech media monitoring wing and an outreach department tasked with building better working relations with journalists.

According to a U.S. intelligence official, who agreed to be quoted on the condition of anonymity, said he believes the Taliban's reference to women's rights issues in a 2010 propaganda campaign was an attempt to mitigate the bad publicity from a Time cover story containing a haunting photo and an article featuring a woman whose face was reportedly mauled by Taliban members. "That really stuck it to them," he said. "Now they're softening their tone regarding women."

References

Further reading
The Taliban Insurgency and an Analysis of Shabnamah (Night Letters). Thomas H. Johnson, Small Wars and Insurgencies Vol. 18, No. 3, 317–344, September 2007
Johnson, Thomas H., Taliban Narratives: The Use and Power of Stories in the Afghanistan Conflict (Oxford University Press, 2019). 

Propaganda
Propaganda by topic
Propaganda in Afghanistan
Propaganda in Pakistan
Jihadist propaganda